Events from the year 1956 in North Korea. Andrei Lankov calls 1956 a turning point in North Korean history. It marked the 3rd Congress of the Workers' Party of Korea (WPK) followed by two important plenums of the Central Committee of the WPK. The plenum in August became known as the August Faction Incident as Kim Il-sung's opponents unsuccessfully tried to oust him. It was followed by another plenum in September that saw Kim being pressured by China and the Soviet Union to tone down his political line. Kim, however, retaliated by beginning the purge of his party's Soviet faction that year.

Incumbents
Premier: Kim Il-sung 
Supreme Leader: Kim Il-sung

Events
 3rd Congress of the Workers' Party of Korea 
 August Faction Incident
 September plenum of the Central Committee of the WPK
 1956 North Korean local elections

See also
List of years in North Korea
List of years in Japan
List of years in South Korea

References

Works cited

 
North Korea
1950s in North Korea
Years of the 20th century in North Korea
North Korea